Raúl Pateras Pescara de Castelluccio (1890 – 1966), marquis of Pateras-Pescara, was an engineer, lawyer and inventor from Argentina who specialized in automobiles, helicopters and free-piston engines.

Pescara is credited for being one of the first people to successfully utilize cyclic pitch, as well as pioneering the use of autorotation for the safe landing of a damaged helicopter.

Biography

Pescara was born in Buenos Aires and at the beginning of the 20th century, his family left Argentina to return to Europe.

Aircraft
In 1911, using a workshop that Pescara was involved with, Gustave Eiffel tested a scale model (1:20) of a seaplane (monoplane design) named the Pateras Pescara, designed by Pescara and Italian engineer Alessandro Guidoni, in a wind tunnel. In 1912, the Italian Ministry of the Navy commissioned Guidoni to build a torpedo bomber based on the Pescara model; but following tests in 1914, Guidoni was unable to create a successful design.

From 1919, Pescara built several coaxial helicopters and submitted numerous patents across several countries. He first tested his machine indoors in 1921, before moving to Paris, France, where government funding was available. His "No. 3" design had two contra-rotating "screws", with each screw having four blades, and each blade a biplane wing with wing warping for control.

On January 16, 1924, at Issy-les-Moulineaux near Paris, Pescara broke his own world record for helicopter flight with his model 2F, The Marquis Pateras, by remaining in the air 8 minutes and 13 4/5 seconds, whilst flying  in a vertical line." On January 29, 1924, whilst attempting to win the French Aero Club prize for a  closed circuit, Pescara completed the course in 10 minutes, 33 seconds, but was not permitted to qualify due to his machine's brief contact with the ground.

Automobiles
In 1929, together with his brother Henri, the Italian engineer Edmond Moglia and the Spanish government, Pescara founded La Fábrica Nacional de Automóviles ("National Automobile Factory") with an investment of 70 million pesetas. Pescara utilized the new factory to focus upon automobiles, and in 1931 he exhibited his creation, the Nacional Pescara, at the 1931 Paris Motor Show. The vehicle appeared at the Grand Palais next to Voisin's and in 1931, the eight-cylinder car won the European Grand Prix for hillclimbing.

Air compressors
The Spanish Civil War forced Pescara to return to France, and on February 28, 1933, the "Pescara Auto-compressor Company" was unveiled in Luxembourg. The auto-compressor company remained in business for 30 years, supported by six French patents  with one of its shareholders, and the Pescara & Raymond Corporation, based in Dover, Delaware, USA. Pescara auto-compressors fulfill two basic designs: symmetrical and asymmetrical.

Free-piston engines and generators
During the Second World War, Pescara worked on electrical power in Portugal. Free-piston engines received new attention when they were mass-produced by the Société Industrielle Générale de Mécanique Appliquée (SIGMA), a French company that developed the GS-34, a 1138-horsepower generator. In 1963, Pescara rejoined his sons in Paris where he served as an expert for S.N. Marep during the testing of its 2000-horsepower EPLH-40. Pescara subsequently proposed the production of more powerful machines - new tandem generators based on the existing EPLH-40 and GS-34 - but died in Paris, France, before the company that was to develop the engineer's proposal was established.

See also
 Castaibert aircraft
 Helicopter
 Helicopter rotor
 History of aviation
 Density altitude
 Invention
 Robert Huber (engineer)

References

Further reading
de Pescara, Christian.  Aérofrance, pages 28–31.  Issue 108.  Dépôt légal: n° CPPAP 61682.
de Pescara, Christian.  Association des Amis du Musée de l'air.  Pégase, pages 12–21   ISSN 0399-9939.
 "Says His Helicopter Can Rise and Hover", New York Times. 24 January 1921, pp. 4.

External links

  Family website
 Pescara History by Robert Huber, former Director of "Bureau Technique Pescara"
 "Helicopter With Six Blades Succeeds In Tests", March 1931, Popular Mechanics
 "The Pescara Helicopter" Flight 1921

Argentine inventors
Argentine aerospace engineers
1890 births
1966 deaths
History of aviation
Aviation inventors
Argentine nobility
Articles containing video clips
People associated with the internal combustion engine
Aviation record holders
Rotorcraft flight record holders
20th-century inventors